

Pre-Islamic structures

Marand Jame' Mosque

Caliphate 661–940

Ark Mosque, 724
Asnaq mosque

Sallarid 942–980

Ghaznavids 963–1187

Seljuq 1037–1194
Ahar Jame' Mosque

Khwarezm 1077–1231

Ilkhanate 1256–1335
Arg of Tabriz

Chupanids 1335–1357

Kara Koyunlu 1375–1468
Blue Mosque, Tabriz

Ak Koyunlu 1378–1508

Timurids 1370–1526
Jamal Abad mosque

Safavids 1501–1736
Imamzadeh Hamzah
Mehr Abad Mosque
Molla Rostam Mosque
Tasooj Jame' Mosque

Zand 1750–1794
Sarab Jame' Mosque

Afsharids 1736–1796

Qajars 1794–1925

Pahlavi dynasty 1925–1979

Modern 1979-present

Unknown
Jomeh Mosque
Hajat mosque
Ajabshir Jame Mosque
Ainaly Mosque
Mianeh Jame Mosque

External links
http://www.irantravelingcenter.com/tabriz_iran.htm

Mosques
List|Mosques
Tabriz
Mosques in Tabriz